The Men's 5,000m T46 had its Final held on September 13 at 10:05.

Medalists

Results

References
Final

Athletics at the 2008 Summer Paralympics